Waterford is a census-designated place and unincorporated community located in Marshall County, Mississippi, United States. It is a small town located between Holly Springs and Oxford on Highway 7. The city once had several small stores, shops and a cotton mill. Currently there is only one store.  The city is also the home of Wall Doxey State Park and is also a part of the Mississippi National Forest.

Waterford is a rural farming community. Its population according to U.S. Beacon in 2000 was 84.

It was first named as a CDP in the 2020 Census which listed a population of 112.

Demographics

2020 census

Note: the US Census treats Hispanic/Latino as an ethnic category. This table excludes Latinos from the racial categories and assigns them to a separate category. Hispanics/Latinos can be of any race.

References 

Unincorporated communities in Marshall County, Mississippi
Unincorporated communities in Mississippi
Census-designated places in Marshall County, Mississippi